Hujariyya can refer to:

 Al-Hujariah, region in Yemen
 Hujariyya (Abbasid troops), an elite cavalry corps of the late Abbasid Caliphate
 Hujariyya (Fatimid Caliphate), a palace military academy, later expanded to an elite corps, of the Fatimid Caliphate